Transport in Kosovo consists of transport by land and air.

Kosovo  is complicated by political issues relating to international recognition. The country declared Independence in 2008 from Serbia. It currently has 101 diplomatic recognitions from members of the United Nations. Transport links to the north are fractured as Serbia does not recognise Kosovo's independence. Kosovo is recognised as sovereign by all other countries with which it shares a border. After the Independence, improvements to the road infrastructure, urban transport, and air travel have all led to a vast improvement in transportation. These upgrades have played a key role in supporting Kosovo's economy.

Road transport 
 
The road transport in Kosovo has significantly improved following the independence of Kosovo. The government of Kosovo in recent years has focused the majority of investments on the construction of numerous motorways specifically on constructing the R6, R7 and R7.1 which connect Kosovo with its neighbouring countries.

In recent years, two major road construction spree took place on the main state roads of Kosovo, involving the construction of new roadways, putting of contemporary signs, planting of trees, and related greening projects. Works on two highways are completed.

Motorways

Air transport  
 
 

Air transport in Kosovo started as early as 1936 when Yugoslav flag carrier Aeroput opened scheduled flights from Belgrade to Skopje through Podujevo airfield as mid stop.

There are three Airports situated in Kosovo, the Gjakova Airport in the city of Gjakova, Batlava-Donja Penduha Airfield in the village of Dumosh and the only international Airport of Pristina in the capital of Kosovo, Pristina. Gjakova's Airport was built by the Kosovo Force (KFOR) following the Kosovo War, next to an existing airfield used for agricultural purposes, and was used mainly for military and humanitarian flights. The local and national government plans to offer Gjakova Airport for operation under a public-private partnership with the aim of turning it into a civilian and commercial airport.

Pristina International Airport is located southwest of Pristina. It is Kosovo's only international airport that handles over 1.75 million passengers per year and the only port of entry for air travelers to Kosovo.

Airports: 10 ; *Airports with paved runways: 4 ; **2,438 to 3,047 m: 1 ; **1,524 to 2,437 m: 1 ; **Under 914 m: 2 ; *Airports  with unpaved runways: 4 ; **Under 914 m: 4 ; *Heliports: 2

Rail transport

The first railway line was built under Turkish guidance for the Compagnie des Chemins de Fer Orientaux (CO), led by Maurice de Hirsch. It started in Thessaloniki, went on north to Skopje and reached Kosovska Mitrovica in 1873.
Before the First World War it was used by the Serbian Railways which operated as Yugoslav Railways between 1918 and 1992, and stopped their operations in Kosovo after the NATO intervention in 1999. In 2008 Serbian Railways restored some of its routes in Northern Kosovo region.

Trainkos operates  of railway in Kosovo, of which  serve both freight and passenger and  only serve freight traffic. The non-electrified network originally consisted of two lines crossing at Kosovo Polje railway station in Kosovo Polje: A main line going from Kraljevo in western Serbia via Mitrovica and Kosovo Polje to Skopje in North Macedonia, and a branch line in east-west direction from Niš in southern Serbia via Pristina railway station in the capital Pristina and Kosovo Polje with one branch leading to Peć and the other one to Prizren. Of these lines, the one from Pristina to Peć and the one from Kosovo Polje to Macedonia are still served by passenger trains. Some more parts of the network are occasionally served by freight trains, like Kosovo Polje - Obilić; the other parts of the network are currently unused. For years, there have been plans to extend the branch to Prizren across the border to Albania, to create a link to the network of the Hekurudha Shqiptare. However, these projects are no more than letters of intent.

Total: 430 km ; *Country comparison to the world: 115 ; *Standard gauge: 430 km 1.435-m gauge

See also 
  
 Economy of Kosovo
 Geography of Kosovo  
 Transport in Prishtina
 Vehicle registration plates of Kosovo

Notes

References

External links 

 Civil Aviation Authority of Kosovo Official Website